Cyclaxyridae are a family of beetles in the superfamily Cucujoidea. The only living genus is Cyclaxyra, with two species endemic to New Zealand. Other species have been named from fossils. They are also known as sooty mould beetles due to the association of Cyclaxyra with sooty mould. The extant species are mycophagous, feeding on spores, conidia, and hyphae.

Genera 

 Cyclaxyra Broun, 1893, New Zealand, recent
 Cyclaxyra jelineki Gimmel, 2009
 Cyclaxyra politula (Broun, 1881)
 †Electroxyra Gimmel, Szawaryn, Cai and Leschen, 2019
 Electroxyra cretacea (Wu in Wu, Li and Ding, 2018) Burmese amber, Myanmar, Late Cretaceous (Cenomanian)
 †Pacyclaxyra Tihelka, Huang and Cai, 2021
 Pacyclaxyra azari Tihelka, Huang and Cai, 2021 Burmese amber, Myanmar, Cenomanian
 †Neolitochropus Lyubarsky and Perkovsky, 2016
 Neolitochropus hoffeinsorum Lyubarsky & Perkovsky, 2016 Bitterfeld amber, Rovno amber, Baltic amber, Europe, Eocene

References 

Cucujoidea families